Ross Elliott Montgomery (born December 10, 1946) is a former American football running back in the National Football League who played for the Chicago Bears. He played college football for the TCU Horned Frogs.

After his NFL career, he was a judge.

References

1946 births
Living people
American football running backs
Chicago Bears players
TCU Horned Frogs football players